Zabukovje is a Slovene place name that may refer to:

Zabukovje nad Sevnico, a village in the Municipality of Sevnica, southeastern Slovenia
Zabukovje pri Raki, a village in the Municipality of Krško, eastern Slovenia
Zabukovje, Kranj, a village in the Municipality of Kranj, northwestern Slovenia
Zabukovje, Šentrupert, a village in the Municipality of Šentrupert, southeastern Slovenia
Zabukovje, Vojnik, a village in the Municipality of Vojnik, eastern Slovenia